The Samsung Galaxy A73 5G is a mid-high range Android-based smartphone developed and manufactured by Samsung Electronics as a part of its Galaxy A series. The phone was announced on 17 March 2022 at Samsung Galaxy Unpacked event alongside the Galaxy A33 5G and Galaxy A53 5G.

Design 
The screen is made of Corning Gorilla Glass 5. The back panel and side are made of frosted plastic.

The smartphone is similar in design to its predecessor, but as in the Samsung Galaxy A33 5G and Samsung Galaxy A53 5G, the rear panel is now completely flat, and the transition between the rear panel and the camera unit is smoother. The Galaxy A73 5G, unlike the Samsung Galaxy A72, does not have a 3.5 mm audio jack. The smartphone also has protection against moisture and dust according to the IP67 standard.

Below are the USB-C connector, speaker and microphone. Depending on the version, there is a slot for 1 SIM card and a microSD memory card up to 1 TB or a hybrid slot for 2 SIM cards or 1 SIM card and a microSD memory card up to 1 TB and a second microphone. On the right side are the volume buttons and the smartphone lock button.

Samsung Galaxy A73 5G is sold in 3 colors: green (Awesome Mint), gray (Awesome Gray) and white (Awesome White).

Specifications

Hardware 
The Galaxy A73 5G is a smartphone with a slate-type factor form, which is 159.6 × 74.8 × 8.1 mm in size and weighs 189 grams.

The device is equipped with GSM, HSPA, LTE and 5G connectivity, Wi-Fi 802.A/b/g/n/ac/ax dual-band with Bluetooth 5 Wi-Fi Direct support and hotspot support.0 with A2DP and LE, GPS with BeiDou, Galileo, GLONASS and QZSS and NFC. It has a USB-C 2.0 port and no 3.5 mm audio jack input. It is resistant to water and powder with IP67 certification.

It has a 6.7 inch diagonal touchscreen, Super AMOLED+ Infinity-O, rounded corners and FHD+ resolution of 1080 × 2400 pixels. The screen supports a 120 Hz refresh rate. For screen protection it uses Gorilla Glass 5.

The non-removable 5000 mAh lithium polymer battery supports ultra-fast 25 watt charging.

The chipset is a Qualcomm Snapdragon 778G with an octagonal CPU (4 cores at 2.4 GHz + 4 cores at 1.8 GHz). UFS type 2 internal memory. 1 is 128/256 GB expandable with microSD up to 1 TB, while the RAM is 6 or 8 GB (depending on the version chosen).

The rear camera has a 108 MP main sensor with an f/1 opening.The D-SLR-Focus is equipped with a PDAF, OIS, HDR mode and a flash LED mode, capable of recording up to 4K to 30 photograms per second, while the front camera is a single 32MP camera with a recording capacity of up to 8 mm.

Software 
The operating system is Android 12 with One UI 4.1. Upgradable upto Android 13 With One UI 5.0

References 

Samsung Galaxy
Mobile phones introduced in 2022
Android (operating system) devices
Samsung mobile phones
Phablets
Mobile phones with multiple rear cameras
Mobile phones with 4K video recording